Frédéric Lecanu (born 2 April 1979) is a French judoka.

Achievements

References

1979 births
Living people
French male judoka
Universiade medalists in judo
Universiade silver medalists for France
Medalists at the 2003 Summer Universiade
21st-century French people